The Salina Formation is a geologic formation in West Virginia. It preserves fossils dating back to the Silurian period.

A large salt formation in Northeast USA formed during Silurian, and was named Salina Formation in 1863. It is 100,000 square miles underlying parts of New York, Pennsylvania, West Virginia, Ohio, Michigan, and southwestern Ontario. The formation is 150 feet thick on average, containing 2,800 cubic miles of salt. In some places, the formation is 3,000 feet thick, containing several layers of salt and shale.

See also 
 List of fossiliferous stratigraphic units in West Virginia

References 

Silurian West Virginia